Sipra (also known as Sapra, Sipru, Sipraw or Supra) is a Jat clan in the Punjab region of Pakistan.

Notable people
 
 

   Saqlain Anwar Sipra, (former Member Provincial Assembly of Punjab)

References 

Surnames
Jat clans of Punjab
Jat clans of Pakistan
Social groups of Punjab, Pakistan